The 1953 Cork Senior Football Championship was the 65th staging of the Cork Senior Football Championship since its establishment by the Cork County Board in 1887.

Clonakilty entered the championship as the defending champions.

On 8 November 1953, Collins won the championship following a 1-08 to 1-04 defeat of University College Cork in a replay of the final at the Cork Athletic Grounds. This was their fourth championship title overall and their first title since 1951. It remains their last championship title.

Results

Final

Miscellaneous

 Collins Barracks win their last title.

References

Cork Senior Football Championship